Kimilsungia is a hybrid orchid of the genus Dendrobium. It is a clone of a plant that was created in Indonesia by orchid breeder Carl Ludwig C. L. Bundt, who  in 1964 registered the grex name Dendrobium Clara Bundt for all orchids of the same ancestry, naming it after his daughter. It has a complex ancestry from cultivated orchids. An attempt was made to register the grex name Dendrobium Kimilsungia, but this is not valid, it is a later synonym of Dendrobium Clara Bundt. As a cultivar name (applying to only part of the grex), the correct name is Dendrobium Clara Bundt 'Kimilsungia'. Another grex name Dendrobium Kimilsung Flower refers to plants of related but different ancestry.

Another flower, the Kimjongilia, is named after Kim Il-sung's son, Kim Jong-il. Neither the Kimilsungia nor the Kimjongilia are the national flower of North Korea. The national flower of the country is the Magnolia sieboldii with white flowers.

According to the Korean Central News Agency, Kim Il-sung's "peerless character" is "fully reflected in the immortal flower" which is "blooming everywhere on the five continents".

Description
Its leaves adhere to the nodes alternatively and each stalk yields 3-15 flowers. The flowers have three petals and three calyxes and measure . It blooms for 60–90 days.

Annual festivals
The annual Kimilsungia Festival has been held since 1998, and is held around the Day of the Sun. Kimilsungia flower shows are held every year in Pyongyang. Traditionally, embassies of foreign countries in North Korea each present their own bouquet of the flower to the annual exhibition.

See also
 Kimjongilia

References

Further reading

External links

"Kimilsungia Is an Immortal Flower That has Bloomed in the Hearts of Mankind in the Era of Independence" – Kim Jong-il on Kimilsungia, April 6, 2005.

National symbols of North Korea
Dendrobium
Kim Il-sung
Orchid cultivars